Only One in the World is the fourth studio album by Trinidadian-American singer-songwriter Heather Headley. It was released by in:ciite Media on September 25, 2012, just before Headley's West End debut as character Rachel Marron in the musical The Bodyguard. It is a collection of original songs and a number of cover versions of pop songs, showtunes and R&B songs.

Critical reception

Stella Redburn from Cross Rhythms found that "once again Heather demonstrates that she is a class act [...] The production by Paul Mills and Keith Thomas is of the highest quality with a deft blend of MOR, R&B and more theatrical moments. Six of the 12 songs are Heather's own and reflect some of the ups and downs of life." In his review for Allmusic, Andy Kellman remarked that "perhaps it's Headley's work on the stage that has impacted her approach. It's more impressive than it is enjoyable. The performances are not lacking, but they have a grand, larger-than-life quality that somehow sacrifices relatability." He rated the album two and a half stars out of five. Associated Press journalist Nekesa Moody wrote that "Headley loses [her] thrill on fourth album [...] She doesn't put her stamp on any of them and leaves the listener wistfully thinking of the songs' original performers [...] While Headley does have original material, most of it isn't as strong or compelling as her R&B hits "I Wish I Wasn't" and "In My Mind." [...] There's no wonderment here."

Track listing

Charts

References

2012 albums
Heather Headley albums